The Edmonton Rush were a  professional lacrosse team in the National Lacrosse League (NLL) that played from 2006 NLL season to 2015.

The team announced on July 20, 2015, that they would be relocating to Saskatoon, Saskatchewan, for the 2016 season. The Saskatchewan Rush play in the SaskTel Centre.

History
The NLL announced that Edmonton, Alberta would receive an NLL franchise on May 5, 2005.  They played their home games at Rexall Place.  The Edmonton team was owned by businessman Bruce Urban, who purchased the dormant Ottawa Rebel to start the Edmonton team.
Although early reports suggested that they would be playing as the Edmonton Speed, they selected the name Rush on June 9, 2005.

On February 17, 2006, the Rush recorded the first victory in their franchise history, defeating the Calgary Roughnecks 12–11 in a thrilling game, scoring the winning goal with only 0.2 seconds left in the game. Their first home victory didn't come until their second season, when they defeated the Philadelphia Wings 13–12 on January 6, 2007, in the season opener.

After starting the 2008 NLL season with an 0–5 record, the Rush fired the franchise's original head coach and general manager, Paul Day, and replaced him with former NLL Coach and GM of the Year, Bob Hamley. The Rush finished the season last in the West with a 4–12 record, and after rebuilding much of the team in the off-season, the Rush struggled again in 2009. After finishing last in the West for the second straight season, Hamley was fired.

Relocation

During Edmonton's playoff run in 2015 Urban began threatening to move the team, telling the Edmonton Sun "It appears that it's coming to an end. After much speculation, the team officially announced they'd be moving to Saskatoon, Saskatchewan to play as the Saskatchewan Rush beginning in 2016. Urban cited the lack of a long-term deal at Rogers Place, which was slated to replace Rexall Place as Edmonton's main arena. Additionally, the Oilers refused to let the Rush put any of their signage at Rexall Place, a move that Urban claimed harmed the Rush's marketing efforts.

Rivalry with the Calgary Roughnecks

The arrival of the Rush created another version of "The Battle Of Alberta". The head coach of the Edmonton Rush however, has come under fire by the Calgary Roughnecks. The Rush took out ads in Calgary newspapers before their first meeting that the Rush would "Open a Can" on the Roughnecks.

This proved to backfire as the Roughnecks defeated the Rush in their first meeting.

The tactic continued though when the Rush were playing the Toronto Rock, but once again it proved to backfire as the Rock easily won.

However, Calgary tried this tactic against Edmonton before the April 5, 2008 game by taking an ad in the Edmonton Sun saying that Edmonton was a "City of Losers" instead of a city of champions. Just as it had for the Rush, the plan backfired as the Rush won 11–9.

The rivalry heated up March 13, 2009 in Edmonton as Calgary built up a 14-3 halftime lead over the Rush. At the one second mark of the 3rd quarter, a line brawl broke out between the two teams resulting in nine fighting majors and nine misconducts.

Edmonton did get the upper hand in the first playoff meeting between the teams as the Rush won 11–7 in Calgary on May 1, 2010.

Edmonton had played four games against the Calgary Roughnecks in the 2012 season.  The Rush went 0/4 in the regular season when they faced the Calgary Roughnecks. Calgary ended their season with the record of 12–4, while Edmonton dominated the second ever playoff Battle Of Alberta with a win over Calgary 19–11.  Edmonton went on to the Western division final against the Minnesota Swarm toward another win, 15–3, and headed to the NLL finals.

Roster

Retired numbers

Hall of Famers

Team captains

Head coaches

All-time record

Playoff results

Franchise scoring leaders
These are the top-ten point-scorers in franchise history. Figures are updated after each completed NLL regular season.

Note: Pos = Position; GP = Games Played; G = Goals; A = Assists; Pts = Points; P/G = Points per game; G/G = Goals per game; A/G = Assists per game; * = current Rush player

Team records
Single Season
Goals - Mark Matthews, 53 (2015)
Assists - Mark Matthews, 62 (2015)
Points - Mark Matthews, 114 (2015)
PIM - Jamie Floris, 67 (2009)
Loose Balls - Brodie Merrill, 190 (2010)
Forced Turnovers - Kyle Rubisch, 61 (2014)

NLL awards

Champion's Cup
2015

Finals MVP
Mark Matthews: 2015

Rookie of the Year Award
Mark Matthews: 2013
Ben McIntosh: 2015

Defensive Player of the Year Award
Kyle Rubisch: 2012, 2013, 2014, 2015

Transition Player of the Year Award
Brodie Merrill: 2010

Les Bartley Award
Derek Keenan: 2010, 2014

GM of the Year Award
Derek Keenan: 2010, 2014

See also
 Edmonton Rush seasons

References

Rush
Defunct National Lacrosse League teams
Lacrosse clubs established in 2005
Lacrosse teams in Alberta
2005 establishments in Alberta
2015 disestablishments in Alberta
Lacrosse clubs disestablished in 2015